Ammeh and Ameh may refer to:
 Ammeh, Kermanshah
 Ammeh, Khuzestan
Ada Ameh (1974–2022), Nigerian actress